Felix Semper (born June 1964) is a Cuban American artist. Semper gained popularity with his Notorious BIG work inspired by a photo of the late rapper The Notorious B.I.G. He crafted the sculpture from thousands of layers of glued paper.

Exhibitions 
Semper's first major solo exhibit in New York City took place in 2018.  His work has been exhibited internationally, including representing the US in the 7th Annual Cultural & Design Expo, Suzhou, China.  While in Suzhou, Felix created a moveable sculpture of the "Pants Building". In Mallorca, he exhibited a line of paper Hermes handbag sculptures.

Semper's first museum exhibition in Denmark in 2021-23,"Paper People" Museum for Papirkunst where he exhibited his stretchable paper sculpture busts of Jose Marti, Thalia, A$AP Rocky and others, also on view is Semper's documentary film "Love Art Revolution".

Semper was commissioned by the Playing for Change Foundation to create the 2022 Impact awards for Paula Abdul and Luis Fonsi they were presented in Miami Beach.

Semper was invited by the ministry of culture to exhibit in 2022, Riyadh, Saudi Arabia, ten of his stretchable paper sculptures.

He has also exhibited in Barcelona, and other locations in the US.

Television and Radio 
Semper and his work have made various television appearances including on El Hormiguero based in Madrid, Spain, Live with Kelly and Ryan, The Wendy Williams Show, FOX- Good Day New York, MTV, NHK, PBS, Pickler & Ben, CBS-The Henry Ford's Innovation Nation, NBC-Access Hollywood . Radio: Elvis Duran and The Morning Show.

StoryBooked, a documentary series produced by Marriott International, featured Semper in an episode set in Spain.

References 

Cuban emigrants to the United States
21st-century American sculptors
21st-century American male artists
American male sculptors
1964 births
Living people
Cuban sculptors
People from Havana
Spanish sculptors
Spanish male sculptors